Sherryl is an unincorporated community in Granite County, Montana, United States, located 8.7 miles south of Drummond on the Pintler Veterans Memorial Scenic Highway. The community is served by the post office in Hall.

External links 
Sherryl on Google Maps

Unincorporated communities in Granite County, Montana